GOME Electrical Appliances Holding Limited (国美电器 in Chinese)() changed its name to GOME Retail Holdings Ltd.. It is one of the largest privately owned electrical appliance retailers in mainland China and Hong Kong. It was founded by Wong Kwong Yu (Huang Guangyu), a Chinese businessman, in Beijing in 1987. Its brand name "GOME" was first adopted in 1993. Since 1999, it has developed outside Beijing and established retail outlets in other Chinese cities. It was listed on the Hong Kong Stock Exchange in 2004. As of 2008 Wong is the chairperson, the controlling shareholder, and the director. The company is incorporated in Bermuda.

History
In 1987 GOME's first electrical appliance retail outlet was opened in Beijing. In 1999 the company expanded outside of Beijing to Tianjin. In 2004, GOME was selected as one of the "Key and Strategically Important Enterprises" in China by the Ministry of Commerce. In 2006 the company merged with China Paradise.

As of 2010 there are a total of 826 stores, 572 traditional stores, 13 digital stores and 2 flagship stores throughout mainland China.

In November 2008 the Hong Kong Stock Exchange indefinitely halted trading of the company shares after police revealed that Wong was under investigation for stock manipulation. He resigned from company chairman on 16 January 2009.

In November 2010, the company reported third quarter 2010 net profit of 477.5 million yuan, an increase of 24 per cent from the same period in 2009, despite a public dispute between founder Wong and chairman Chen Xiao over business strategy.

In January 2013, it was announced that Gome badged retail stores in Hong Kong would begin to close from March 2013, the six stores concerned are owned directly by Wong and not the listed company. The move marks a shift in emphasis for the company from one based on overseas expansion to one based on an increasing presence online and in second tier Chinese cities, although the company will remain in Hong Kong as a wholesaler.

References

External links 

GOME Electrical Appliances Holding Limited (China) 
GOME Electrical Appliances Holding Limited (Hong Kong)

Privately held companies of China
Retail companies established in 1987
Companies based in Beijing
Companies listed on the Hong Kong Stock Exchange
Consumer electronics retailers of China
Whitegoods retailers of China
Bain Capital companies
Retail companies of Hong Kong
Chinese companies established in 1987